Arisaema section Arisaema is a section of the genus Arisaema.

Description
Plants in this section are deciduous with a stem tuber with roots around the base. Leaves solitary, rarely two; trifoliate. Fruiting peduncle erect.

Distribution
Plants from this section are found in the Himalayas from India, Bhutan and Nepal to Southwestern China and Myanmar.

Species
Arisaema section Arisaema comprises the following species:

References

Plant sections